The Four Big Things is a term originally applied to the four symbols of material success in China from the 1950s until the 1970s, and is now used to refer to any visible marker of newfound affluence. The original list was:

 A sewing machine
 A bicycle
 A wristwatch, generally from Shanghai Watch Company
 A radio receiver, usually Red Star or Red Lantern brand

More recently, the "Four Big Things" could include televisions, refrigerators, cameras, cell phones, computers, apartments, cars, etc.

References

4 (number)
Chinese words and phrases
Consumer symbols
Economic history of the People's Republic of China
Wealth in China